The Military ranks of Oman are the military insignia used by the Sultan of Oman's Armed Forces. Oman shares a rank structure similar to that of the United Kingdom.

Commissioned officer ranks
The rank insignia of commissioned officers.

Other ranks
The rank insignia of non-commissioned officers and enlisted personnel.

References

External links
 

Oman
Military of Oman
Oman